Days N' Daze is an American band formed in Houston, Texas performing a type of folk punk they have called 'H-Town Thrashgrass'. Promoting a strong DIY ethic, Days N' Daze independently records, produces, and promotes all their own music. Song themes range from anarchism and environmental issues to anxiety, alcoholism, and parties.
They are known for their energetic live shows. Days N' Daze has toured extensively in the US, Canada, and Europe, playing anything from house shows to festivals.
Days N' Daze has opened for several national acts, including The Infamous Stringdusters, M.D.C., New Zealand's Night Gaunts, Cancerslug, and  Black Flag (Band) founder Chuck Dukowski's Sextet.

History
Days N' Daze was founded in 2008 by Whitney Flynn and Jesse Sendejas who both grew up in Rosenberg, Texas,. They knew each other since high school and had been sweethearts before the founding of the band. 
In the beginning, they were the band's only members: Whitney Flynn, with a musical background of classical piano lessons at a young age, followed by years as a trumpeter in her junior and high school's marching band. And Jesse Sendejas, a self-taught guitar player, was introduced to music at an early age by his father, a Houston Press music writer. In the beginning, Flynn and Sendejas didn't have enough funds to buy musical equipment to start a proper punk band, so they started playing all-acoustic. Yet in the band's early days the now characteristic trumpet sound was still absent, as Sendejas felt it wouldn't fit the musical style they were playing. However, he changed his mind after about two years of Flynn's persuasive efforts to give it a try.

Flynn graduated a year early from high school and enrolled at Texas State University in San Marcos. Sendejas, still attending high school, soon afterward abandoned education altogether and joined Flynn in San Marcos, a college town both started to loathe early on. In the following years, still being a couple, they started touring extensively and recorded their first four albums. These recordings took place in a closet in the house of Sendejas' father in Richmond, Texas, the same place the band is still recording their albums today. It was during this time that the band grew by two more members: Marissa Sendejas, Jesse's sibling playing washboard, and Freddie Boatright, playing the gutbucket. According to Sendejas, this initial choice of instruments was purely a matter of cost. He and Flynn wanted to play punk music from the start but did not have the funds to buy expensive equipment like drums.

Eventually, Flynn dropped out of university without a degree, a decision that has been attributed by some to the immense touring schedule of DnD at the time. However, according to Flynn herself, it was a series of circumstances that led her to leave university education. Among those was the death of her grandfather and the nearly contemporaneous separation from Sendejas as her partner. In the course of these events, she left the university city of San Marcos in 2012 to live for a couple of months without a fixed address. Today Flynn manages Days N' Daze mostly on her own and not only takes care of their finances but handled tour booking for nine years before Crawlspace Booking signed them onto their agency.  As Days N' Daze's popularity has grown over the last couple of years and management has become more challenging, Flynn mentioned ideas to continue her education in the area of "music business".

Instead of quitting the band after their breakup, Sendejas and Flynn channeled this emotional turmoil into writing and recording their sixth album Rogue Taxidermy. As of today (08/2018) Rogue Taxidermy is their most regarded and top-selling album on Bandcamp. The video of the album's song Misanthropic Drunken Loner has gathered over 6.5 million views on YouTube. The album was released the same year as Oogle Deathmachine. In March 2017 they released Crustfall, which features amongst others Leftöver Crack's Scott Sturgeon. The album title is a wordplay between Crust-Punk and a group exercise called Trust fall.

The dynamic between Flynn and Sendejas has changed considerably over time. While both are still friendly and equally responsible for writing the music of Days N' Daze, a process Sendejas described graphically as two Maelstroms rotating against each other, it has become difficult for the both of them to travel in the same vehicle on tour without starting to hurt each other emotionally.

Days N' Daze have been playing in their current lineup since 2014. As a replacement for Freddie Boatright, who left the band after having a child, Geoff Bell was recruited in 2013 as their gutbucket player at an open gutbucket night, five days before the start of an upcoming DnD tour. Meagan Michelle joined the band in 2014 when their then washboard player was prohibited from crossing state borders due to legal reasons. Days N' Daze has an extensive history of touring with several known bands and artists including: Leftöver Crack, We the Heathens, The Infamous Stringdusters, M.D.C., Morning Glory, Night Gaunts (NZ), Cancerslug, or Black Flag founder Chuck Dukowski's Sextet.

On December 20, 2019 Days N' Daze announced that they are working on a new album. On May 1, 2020 the album Show Me The Blueprints was released.

On July 1st, 2022, Daze N' Daze added the album Ward off the Vultures to their Spotify.

Side projects 

Both Jesse Sendejas and Whitney Flynn are and have been involved in several side projects over the last couple of years. They play together in Decathect, a band that rather resembles a "normal" punk band with its layout consisting of vocals (Flynn/Sendejas), guitar, bass, and drums (Sendejas). Flynn plays trumpet in this band as well. The name "Decathect" describes the act of withdrawing one's feelings of attachment from a person or idea in the anticipation of future loss. Decathect has only released one demo EP to date.

Together with his sibling Marissa, Sendejas has been active in a band called Chad Hates George since 2012 which has put out two releases thus far. In addition, he is most active with his band Escape from the Zoo with whom he has released two EPs and the album KILLACOPTER in 2017.

Whitney Flynn was an integral part of the My Pizza My World collective, with which she released four EPs and albums, before breaking up in 2016. Today Flynn occasionally plays solo shows as a solo artist under her own name or under her pseudonym "Death By Skwerl". Next to acoustic versions of Days N' Daze or My Pizza My World songs she also plays new songs of hers on guitar or ukulele. She toured as a solo act through New Zealand and Australia in November 2017.

Both Flynn and Sendejas appeared on various songs of Dirty Harry's 2018 release Get Busy Living Or Get Busy Crying.

Band members

Current members
 Jesse Sendejas – lead vocals, acoustic guitar, accordion, banjo (2008–present)
  Whitney Flynn – lead vocals, trumpet, ukulele  (2008–present)
  Meagan Michelle – washboard, backing vocals (2014–present)
  Matt Willhelm – standup bass (2021–present)

Former members
 Geoff Bell – washtub bass (2013–2021)
 Marissa Sendejas – backing vocals, washboard, piano (2011–2013)
 Freddie Boatright – backing vocals, washtub bass (2011–2012)

Discography

Studio albums
We Never Said It Was Good (2008)
Perfectly Dysfunctional (2009)
Here Goes Nothin''' (2010)Ward Off The Vultures (2011)The Oogle Deathmachine (2013)Rogue Taxidermy (2013)Crustfall (2017)
Songs We Recorded For Splits (2019)
Show Me the Blueprints (2020)

SplitsDays N' Daze // Arroyo Deathmatch Split (2012)Days N' Daze // Rail Yard Ghosts Split (2014)Days N' Daze // Broken Bow Split (2014)Thanks Mom! Split w/ Chicos Del Muertos (Live Recordings) (2015)Days N' Daze // Night Gaunts Split (2015)Days N' Daze // Andrew Paley "Caroline" Split'' (2021)

Music videos
 Misanthropic Drunken Loner (2014)
 Fallout (2014)
 Call in the Coroner (2015)
 SHITMACHINE (2015)
 Post Party Depression (2016)
 Bedbugs & Beyond(2016) (Leftöver Crack cover)
 Damaged Goods (2017)
 Days N' Daze of Our Lives (2018)
 Self Loathing (2020)

References

External links

Official Website

Folk punk groups
Musical groups from Houston
Musical groups established in 2008